FC Artania Ochakiv was a Ukrainian football club from Ochakiv, Mykolaiv Oblast.

Historical outlook
The city team Mayak Ochakov (Ochakiv) first appeared in 1987 at the championship of Mykolaiv Oblast. Previously Ochakiv was represented since 1950s by such teams like "Medik" (1950s), "Pishchevik", "Chernomorets" (1960s), "Kolos" (1970s). The new team appeared on initiative of Ochakiv native Valery Zhuravko.

In 1995 it was merged with FC Enerhiya Yuzhnoukrainsk.

The club's football academy was preserved and in 1997 it participated in international competitions in Sweden.

In 2014 there was created new club FC Ochakiv.

Honours
 Soviet football cup among teams KFK
 Winners (1): 1990
 Football championship of Mykolaiv Oblast
 Winners (1): 1989

League and cup history

{|class="wikitable"
|-bgcolor="#efefef"
! Season
! Div.
! Pos.
! Pl.
! W
! D
! L
! GS
! GA
! P
!Domestic Cup
!colspan=2|Europe
!Notes
|-
|align=center colspan=14|Mayak Ochakiv
|-
|align=center rowspan=2|1989
|align=center rowspan=2|4th "5"
|align=center|1
|align=center|24
|align=center|20
|align=center|2
|align=center|2
|align=center|51
|align=center|14
|align=center|42
|align=center rowspan=2|
|align=center rowspan=2|
|align=center rowspan=2|
|align=center|Final group
|-
|align=center|2
|align=center|5
|align=center|3
|align=center|0
|align=center|2
|align=center|7
|align=center|7
|align=center|6
|align=center|
|-
|align=center rowspan=2|1990
|align=center rowspan=2|4th "5"
|align=center|1
|align=center|30
|align=center|20
|align=center|8
|align=center|2
|align=center|66
|align=center|18
|align=center|48
|align=center rowspan=2|
|align=center rowspan=2|
|align=center rowspan=2|
|align=center|Final group
|-
|align=center|2
|align=center|5
|align=center|3
|align=center|0
|align=center|2
|align=center|7
|align=center|5
|align=center|6
|align=center|Promoted
|-
|align=center|1991
|align=center|3rd  "1"
|align=center|23
|align=center|50
|align=center|15
|align=center|10
|align=center|25
|align=center|51
|align=center|76
|align=center|40
|align=center|
|align=center|
|align=center|
|align=center|Joined Ukrainian championship
|-
|align=center colspan=14|Artania Ochakiv
|-
|align=center|1992
|align=center|2nd "B"
|align=center|3
|align=center|26
|align=center|13
|align=center|6
|align=center|7
|align=center|27
|align=center|24
|align=center|32
|align=center|
|align=center|
|align=center|
|align=center|
|-
|align=center|1992–93
|align=center|2nd
|align=center|18
|align=center|42
|align=center|15
|align=center|5
|align=center|22
|align=center|42
|align=center|73
|align=center|35
|align=center|
|align=center|
|align=center|
|align=center|
|-
|align=center|1993–94
|align=center|2nd
|align=center|19
|align=center|38
|align=center|9
|align=center|6
|align=center|23
|align=center|29
|align=center|69
|align=center|24
|align=center|
|align=center|
|align=center|
|align=center|Relegated
|-
|align=center|1994–95
|align=center|3rd
|align=center|15
|align=center|42
|align=center|13
|align=center|8
|align=center|21
|align=center|30
|align=center|58
|align=center|47
|align=center|1/64 finals
|align=center|
|align=center|
|align=center|Merged
|}

Coaches
 1987 – 1994 Valery Zhuravko
 1994 – 1995 Viktor Stepanov

References

 
Artania Ochakiv
Football clubs in Mykolaiv Oblast
Association football clubs established in 1987
Association football clubs disestablished in 1995
1987 establishments in Ukraine
1995 disestablishments in Ukraine